DigitalThink was an electronic learning (eLearning) company. Founded in 1996 by Umberto Milletti, Pete Goettner and Steve Zahm  At one time it was termed a Business Solution Provider (BSP) but would likely be viewed in modern terms as a software-as-a-service (SaaS) model.

DigitalThink was one of the first eLearning companies to incorporate online mentors and tutors into their offering. A notable accomplishment of the company was to secure a deal with McDonald's corporation to provide McDonald's with a global, web-based training program.

Acquisition by Convergys Corporation
The company was acquired in March 2004 by Convergys Corporation for $120 million, or approximately $2.40 per share.

References

 Cincinnati company will buy DigitalThink for $120M - San Francisco Business Times
 Hyderabad To Be DigitalThink’s Global Development Hub
 SignOnSanDiego.com | The San Diego Union-Tribune | San Diego Green Guide
 DigitalThink to reveal new capital - CNET News
 THE DAY AHEAD: Can investors learn to love DigitalThink? - CNET News

Training companies of the United States
Software companies based in the San Francisco Bay Area
Companies based in San Francisco
Software companies established in 1996
1996 establishments in California
Defunct software companies of the United States